Bad as I Wanna B is the fifth album released by American rapper MC Lyte. It was released on August 27, 1996, for EastWest Records and was produced by Jermaine Dupri, Rashad Smith, Carl-So-Lowe, R. Kelly, Goldenboy (K-Cut), MC Lyte and Nat Robinson.

Bad as I Wanna B peaked at No. 59 on the Billboard 200, the MC Lyte's highest position on this chart, and No. 11 on the Top R&B Albums chart. In Germany, the album reached No. 95 on the Offizielle Top 100, becoming MC Lyte's first studio album to chart outside of the United States.

The album featured two charting singles, "Keep On, Keepin' On," which reached No. 10 on the Billboard Hot 100 and No. 27 on the UK Singles Chart, and "Cold Rock a Party," which reached No. 11 on the Billboard Hot 100 and No. 15 on the UK Singles Chart. Both singles were certified Gold by the RIAA.

Track listing
"Keep On, Keepin' On"- 4:32 (Featuring Xscape)
"Have U Ever"- 3:33
"Everyday"- 3:45 
"Cold Rock a Party"- 4:17
"TRG (The Rap Game)"- 4:03
"One on One"- 3:46
"Zodiac"- 2:45
"Druglord Superstar"- 4:02 
"Keep on Keepin' On" (Remix)- 4:57 
"Two Seater"- 4:09

Charts

References

1996 albums
MC Lyte albums
Elektra Records albums
Albums produced by Jermaine Dupri
Albums produced by K-Cut (producer)
Albums produced by R. Kelly